Armadillidium vulgare, the common pill-bug, potato bug, common pill woodlouse, roly-poly, slater, doodle bug, or carpenter, is a widespread European species of woodlouse. It is the most extensively investigated terrestrial isopod species.

Description
It can be distinguished from Armadillidium nasatum and Armadillidium depressum by the gap that A. nasatum and A. depressum leave when rolling into a ball; A. vulgare does not leave such a gap.

Ecology
Armadillidium vulgare is able to withstand drier conditions than many other woodlouse species, and is restricted to calcareous soils or coastal areas. It feeds chiefly on decaying plant matter, but also grazes lichens and algae from tree bark and walls.

It is able to regulate its temperature through its behaviour, preferring bright sunshine when temperatures are low, but remaining in shadow when temperatures are high; temperatures below  or above  are lethal to it. A. vulgare is less susceptible to cold during the night, and may enter a state of dormancy during the winter in order to survive temperatures that would otherwise be lethal.

Distribution
The native distribution of A. vulgare ranges across Europe, especially in the Mediterranean Basin. In the United Kingdom, A. vulgare is very common in southern and eastern England, but is more confined to coastal areas in the north. Similarly, in Ireland, A. vulgare is common in the south and east, but rarer in the north and west.

It is now one of the most abundant invertebrate species in California coastal grassland habitats. It has also been introduced, to a lesser extent, to sites across the world.

Relationships with humans
Because of their unusual yet non-threatening appearance, some Armadillidium vulgare are kept as pets in areas throughout the world. Different lineages are bred, usually in regards to color, in order to provide stock to hobbyists. One supposed variation, "Punta Cana," is often referred to as Armadillidium sordidum, while others insist it is a variety of A. vulgare. Keeping a pet pill bug requires a very moist habitat with limited light and abundant decaying botanical matter. They can often live up to three years. Among non-hobbyist adults, they are often seen as unwanted (but essentially harmless) home pests.

Mitochondrial genome
Most metazoans have circular mitochondrial genomes, but A.vulgare has an unusual combination of both circular and linear mitochondrial DNA.

Gallery

References

External links
 
 

Woodlice
Woodlice of Europe
Crustaceans described in 1804